Belle Chuo (born 4 September 1986), also known as Xiong Xiong is a Taiwanese actress and model.

Life 
She was born under the name Wang Yü-fei but later follows her mother's surname. Since her debut, she has been in the spotlight for her gorgeous beauty, and even topped the list of popular search words on Yahoo! Kimo, Taiwanese Internet portal site.

In 2010, she cooperated with Mickey Huang in his Little Sexy art photography debut. In 2013, she won FHM Taiwan's "100 Best Sexy Beauty" and ETtoday's "Beautiful Breast Goddess Award". In 2018, she hosted the Internet program Starlight Cloud! RUN Newspaper with Lin Po-sheng (KID), and the Internet program Please, Convenience Store with Huang Xiaoyi and Fred.

She made her debut in 2012 on a Taiwan Beauty Communication photo DVD taken in Japan and participated in exclusive interviews with the Toyo Newspaper ASCII, Friday Digital Magazine. In 2014, she made a special appearance in the film My Geeky Nerdy Buddies and starred in The Good Detectives of PMAM, the third season of the CTi television drama PMAM Series. She also played a supporting role in the CTV television drama CSIC 2 / i Hero 2.

Filmography

Television

Film

References

External links 

 

1986 births
Living people
Taiwanese film actresses
Taiwanese television actresses
Taiwanese female models
Actresses from Taipei
21st-century Taiwanese actresses